Anthidium chilense is a species of bee in the family Megachilidae, the leaf-cutter, carder, or mason bees.

Distribution
Argentina
Chile

References

chilense
Insects described in 1851